George Foster "Sandy" Sanford (June 4, 1870 – May 23, 1938) was an American football player and coach.  He served as the head coach at Columbia University (1899–1901), the University of Virginia (1904), Yale University (c.1910) where his title was adviser and he took no pay, and Rutgers University (1913–1923), compiling a career college football record of 84–46–6.  Sanford was inducted into the College Football Hall of Fame as a coach in 1971.

Biography
Sanford was born on June 4, 1870. He played college football at Yale University.  After retiring from coaching, Sanford was president of the insurance brokerage firm of Smyth, Sanford & Gerard, Inc. in Manhattan, New York City.  

He died of a heart attack on May 23, 1938 at the age of 67 at Presbyterian Hospital in Manhattan.

Head coaching record

References

External links
 

1870 births
1938 deaths
19th-century players of American football
American football centers
Businesspeople in insurance
Columbia Lions football coaches
Rutgers Scarlet Knights football coaches
Virginia Cavaliers football coaches
Yale Bulldogs football players
College Football Hall of Fame inductees
Yale Law School alumni
People from Chemung County, New York
Players of American football from New York (state)